Saul Gorn (10 November 1912 – 22 February 1992) was an American pioneer in computer and information science who was a member of the School of Engineering and Applied Science at the University of Pennsylvania for more than 30 years.

Gorn was hired by the Moore School as an associate professor in 1955. He worked on the early ENIAC and EDVAC computers.

The concept of a Gorn address comes from a paper by him, and the Association for Computing Machinery (ACM) presented him its Distinguished Service Award for 1974.

The Saul Gorn Memorial Lecture series has been established at the University of Pennsylvania in his memory.

References

External links

 "Self-Annihilating Sentences: Saul Gorn's Compendium of Rarely Used Clichés", University of Pennsylvania Department of Computer and Information Science Technical Report No. MS-CIS-85-0, January 1985; reissued in memoriam as No. MS-CIS-92-25, March 1992. (An unsourced collection of oxymoronic and tautological quotes.)
 "Saul Gorn", in John A. N. Lee, International Biographical Dictionary of Computer Pioneers, 1995, pp. 342–348

1912 births
1992 deaths
University of Pennsylvania faculty
American computer scientists